The Curtis House, Rickmansworth was the first solar house in the United Kingdom. The house, in Rickmansworth, England, was built in 1956 by British architect Edward Curtis, for his own occupation.

References

External links 
"Dream House" - British Pathe film showing the house

Houses in Hertfordshire
Solar design